The 1934 South Sydney Rabbitohs season was the 27th in the club's history. The club competed in the New South Wales Rugby Football League Premiership (NSWRFL), finishing the season fourth.

Ladder

Fixtures

Trials

Regular season

Finals

Statistics

References 

South Sydney Rabbitohs seasons
South Sydney season